Edmund Wierciński (1899-1955) was a Polish stage director, actor and educator.

Married to actress Maria Wiercińska.

References
Edmund Wierciński

1899 births
1955 deaths
Polish male actors
Recipients of the State Award Badge (Poland)